Edward "Eddie"/"Ned" Thomas (birth unknown – death unknown), also known by the nickname of "Jumper" or Tommy Gwag, was a Welsh professional rugby league footballer who played in the 1910s and 1920s.

Playing career

International honours
Ned Thomas won a cap for Wales while at Oldham in 1923.

County Cup Final appearances
Ned Thomas played . i.e. number 5, in Wakefield Trinity's 9-8 victory over Batley in the 1924–25 Yorkshire County Cup Final during the 1924–25 season at Headingley Rugby Stadium, Leeds on Saturday 22 November 1924.

References

External links
(archived by web.archive.org) Statistics at orl-heritagetrust.org.uk

Oldham R.L.F.C. players
People from Rhondda
Place of birth missing
Place of death missing
Rugby league players from Carmarthenshire
Rugby union players from Tumble
Rugby league wingers
Wakefield Trinity players
Wales national rugby league team players
Welsh rugby league players
Welsh rugby union players
Year of birth missing
Year of death missing